Penang Water Supply Corporation (abbreviation PBAPP) a State owned company (not to be confused as a GLC) which responsible for water supply services in Penang.

Sports

PBAPP FC
PBAPP FC is a football club owned by Penang Water Supply Corporation (PBAPP)

External links
PBAPP website

1999 establishments in Malaysia
Companies based in Penang
Water companies of Malaysia
Government-owned companies of Malaysia
Malaysian companies established in 1999
Privately held companies of Malaysia